Abdoulaye Keita may refer to:

 Abdoulaye Keita (Guinean footballer) (?–2019), Guinean football goalkeeper of the 1970s and '80s
 Abdoulaye Keita (footballer, born 1990), French football goalkeeper
 Abdoulaye Keita (footballer, born 1994), Malian football defensive midfielder
 Abdoulaye Keita (footballer, born 2002), Spanish football winger
 Abdoulaye Khouma Keita (born 1978), Senegalese football defender